The One St. Maarten People Party (OSPP) is a political party in Sint Maarten founded in 2013 by former Sint Maarten Patriotic Alliance finance commissioner Lenny Priest. At the 2014 general elections on 29 August, the party obtained 1.16% of the votes and failed to obtain a seat in parliament.

References

Political parties in Sint Maarten
Political parties established in 2013
2013 establishments in Sint Maarten